FNA may refer to: 
 Algerian National Front
 β-FNA, beta-funaltrexamine, an opioid antagonist
 Farmers of North America, a Canadian agricultural company
 Fars News Agency, in Iran
 Fédération Française Aéronautique, a French aeroclub association
 Ferrell North America, an American propane company
 Filipino Nurses Association, now the Philippine Nurses Association
 Fine-needle aspiration
 Flora of North America, a multivolume botanical work
 Fondo Nacional de las Artes (National Endowment for the Arts), in Argentina
 Guatemalan Athletics Federation
 Lungi International Airport, in Sierra Leone
 Nicaraguan Athletics Federation
 Norlandair, an Icelandic airline
 a free, open-source reimplementation of the Microsoft XNA Game Studio libraries